Abdoulaye "Yaya" Cisse (born August 25, 1997) is an Ivorian footballer.

Career

College and Amateur 
Cisse began his college soccer career at Eastern Florida State College in 2015, before transferring to Fort Hays State University in 2017.

While at college, Cisse also appeared for USL PDL sides SIMA Águilas and South Georgia Tormenta.

Professional career 
Cisse began 2019 with USL League Two side Dalton Red Wolves, before moving up to sign with the Dalton's professional parent club Chattanooga Red Wolves who play in the USL League One.

References

External links
 
 

1997 births
Living people
Ivorian footballers
Ivorian expatriate footballers
American soccer players
Association football forwards
EFSC Titans men's soccer players
SIMA Águilas players
Tormenta FC players
Chattanooga Red Wolves SC players
Soccer players from Texas
USL League One players
USL League Two players